Christopher Roberts "Chris" Segesman (born 17 June 1979) is an American male water polo player. He was a member of the United States men's national water polo team, playing as a center back. He was a part of the  team at the 2004 Summer Olympics. Chris Segesman went on to coach Mater Dei Women's and Men's Water Polo for twelve seasons. He most recently resigned in December 2017 to Mater Dei's dismay. He created a dynasty at Mater Dei and captured 7 CIF championships in 10 years. On club level he played for Los Angeles Water Polo Club in United States.

References

External links
 

1979 births
Living people
American male water polo players
Water polo players at the 2004 Summer Olympics
Olympic water polo players of the United States
American water polo coaches
People from Santa Barbara, California